Events from the year 1789 in Russia

Incumbents
 Monarch – Catherine II

Events
 Russo-Swedish War (1788–1790)
 June 13 - Battle of Porrassalmi
 July 26 - Battle of Öland (1789)
 August 24 - Battle of Svensksund (1789)
 September 30 - Battle of Elgsö

 Russo-Turkish War (1787–1792)
 August 1 - Battle of Focșani
 September 22 - Battle of Rymnik

 Kirov Plant (factory) established
 Mykolaiv (city) founded
 Moscow Gostiny Dvor shopping mall rebuilt
 St. Vladimir's Cathedral (St. Petersburg)
 Tauride Palace built

Births

 Thaddeus Bulgarin - writer and publisher
 Prince Constantine of Imereti (1789–1844) - Georgian prince, general in Russian service
 Johann Cornies - Prussian Mennonite settler and agricultural reformer
 Pavel Gagarin - statesman
 Fedor Mirkovich - general
 Dmitri Osten-Sacken - Baltic German/Russian general
 Maria Szymanowska - Polish composer and pianist who settled in St. Petersburg
 Mikhail Tikhanov - artist
 Nikolay Turgenev - economist and political theorist

Deaths

 Nikita Akinfiyevich Demidov, industrialist, landowner, scientist
 Semyon Desnitsky, legal scholar

References

1789 in Russia
Years of the 18th century in the Russian Empire